The 2022 Club Deportivo Universidad Católica season is the 82nd season and the club's 48th consecutive season in the top flight of Chilean football. In addition to the domestic league, Universidad Católica are participating in this season's editions of the Copa Chile, the Supercopa de Chile, and the Copa Libertadores.

Squad

Transfers

In

Out

Loans out

New contracts

Pre-season and friendlies

Competitions

Overview

Primera Division

League table

Results summary

Results by round

Matches

Copa Chile

Third stage

Supercopa de Chile

Copa Libertadores

Group stage

The draw for the group stage was held on 25 March 2022, 12:00 PYST (UTC−3), at the CONMEBOL Convention Centre in Luque, Paraguay.<noinclude>

Copa Sudamericana

Knockout phase

Round of 16

Statistics

Squad statistics

† Player left Universidad Católica during the season

Goals

Last updated: 7 July 2022
Source: Soccerway

Assists

*Last updated: 7 July 2022
Source: Soccerway

Clean sheets

Last updated: 7 July 2022
Source: Soccerway

Disciplinary record 

Last updated: 7 July 2022
Source: Soccerway

Notes

References

External links

2022